The Borgo Sant'Antonio Abate (said Bùvero in Neapolitan) is a neighborhood in Naples, Italy. It was founded in the 15th century.

Overview
The principal street is via Sant'Antonio Abate. It is linked to Porta Capuana and Piazza Carlo III. It is a famous market street.

The two important churches are Chiesa di Sant'Antonio Abate and Chiesa di Sant'Anna a Porta Capuana.

References

Zones of Naples